"Vida 23" is a song from American rapper Pitbull's fifth studio album, Armando. The song was written by Clinton Sparks, William Grigahcine, Armando Pérez, and it was produced by Clinton Sparks and DJ Snake. The song was solely created for Pitbull's campaign with Dr. Pepper.

Track listing
Album version
"Vida 23" – 3:20

Credits and personnel
Pitbull – songwriter, vocals
Nayer - vocals
Clinton Sparks – songwriter, producer, arranger, instrumentation, recording and mixing
DJ Snake – producer, arranger and instrumentation
William Grigahcine – songwriter, keyboards and additional production

Source:

Release history

References

External links
 

2010 songs
2010 singles
Pitbull (rapper) songs
Spanish-language songs
Songs written by Pitbull (rapper)
Songs written by Clinton Sparks
Sony Music Latin singles
Songs written by DJ Snake